Bílá spona is a 1960 Czech crime film written and directed by Martin Frič.

Cast
 Čestmír Řanda as Capt. Chládek
 Jarmila Smejkalová as Horáková
 Jan Pohan as Lt. Janda
 Milan Holubár as Lt. Burda
 Václav Tomsovský as Pavel
 Ludmila Bednárová as Lída
 Radoslav Brzobohatý as Nekola
 Lubomír Kostelka as Wiesner
 Blazena Kramesová as Vlasta Ziková
 Ilona Kubásková as Bláhová
 Marta Kucerová as Singer
 Pavla Marsálková as Jandová
 Oldřich Nový as Horák
 Nina Popelíková as Táflová
 Josef Príhoda as Cleaning Shop Employee
 Bohumil Svarc as Stejskal

References

External links
 

1960 films
1960 crime films
1960s Czech-language films
Czech black-and-white films
Czechoslovak black-and-white films
Films directed by Martin Frič
1960s Czech films
Czech crime films